The Kamov Ka-60 Kasatka (("Killer Whale") is a Russian medium twin-turbine military transport helicopter under development by Kamov. It performed its first flight on 24 December 1998.

The civil version is known as Kamov Ka-62.

Design
The Ka-60 has an estimated local military market of 200 units (Army aviation units, Border Police and the Ministry of Internal Affairs). The Ka-60 is to be used for aerial reconnaissance, for transporting air-assault forces, radio-electronic jamming, for special-operations missions and for various light-transport missions. Variations for foreign sale are expected. Manufacture is to take place at Ulan-Ude.

It features a five-blade main rotor and shrouded tail rotor, and is powered by a pair of Safran Ardiden 3Gs, and later by in-development Klimov VK-1600s. It has a 30-minute run-dry gearbox by Zoerkler, and can operate on one engine up to 9,500 ft (2,900m).

Development
The development of the helicopter was long. The program started in 1984, but the first prototype Ka-60-01 flew in December 1998, and the second in 2007.

A civil version, the Ka-62, was initially proposed when the Ka-60 programme was launched, but no production followed owing to development problems with the Ka-60's Saturn RD-600V 1500 hp engines. Instead, an agreement was signed in April 2011 to use the  Turbomeca Ardiden 3G turboshaft for a revised Ka-62. The main rotor will be driven via a new transmission, while the helicopter will have a revised cabin with larger windows and new avionics. First flight of the Ka-62 was planned for May 2013, with certification in 2014. Four prototypes and an initial batch of 16 Ka-62s for the Russian Ministry of Defence were planned, with another 12 ordered by South American civilian customers. Russian certification was expected in 2018, with European EASA certification following in 2020.

The Ka-62 was unveiled in 2012 and flight tests began in 2017. After 434 test flights with three prototypes during 700h, it was certified on 30 November 2021 by Russian regulator Rosaviatsia. Deliveries should begin in 2022, planned production is six units in 2022, eight in 2023 and 10 in 2024. A cargo hook, a winch, a medical module and an anti-icing system should be certified until 2024.

Variants

Ka-60 Basic multi-role model. 
Ka-60U Training version. 
Ka-60K Naval version. 
Ka-60R Reconnaissance version. 
Ka-62 New version for the civilian market. It has a redesigned fuselage with a high degree of composites, a larger cabin than the  earlier demonstrators and will be equipped with Turbomeca Ardiden 3G engines.
Ka-64 Sky Horse Western certified export version equipped with two General Electric T700/CT7 turboshaft engines and five-blade main rotor.

Operators

  
 Russian Air Force (100 on order)
  
 Atlas Taxi Aereo (7 on order)
  
 Vertical de Aviación (5 on order)

Specifications

See also

References

Sources
 Butowski, Piotr. "Russia's Restyled Helicopter". Air International, September 2012, Vol. 82 No. 3. pp. 66–67. .
 Butowski, Piotr. Rosyjskie śmigłowce: kryzys nie mija. Helirussia, Moskwa, 25–27 maja 2017 r., "Lotnictwo Aviation International" Nr. 7/2017, p. 44–45 
 Jackson, Paul. Jane's All The World's Aircraft 2003–2004. Coulsdon, UK:Jane's Information Group, 2003. .
 Mladenov, Alexander. "Kamov's Six Tonne Twin". Air International, January 2014, Vol.86, No. 1. pp. 74–75. .
 Maldenov, Alexander. "Ka-62". Air International, June 2016, Vol. 90, No. 6. pp. 6–7. .
 "Nezavisimaya Gazeta", No.241 (1812), 25 December 1998. translation

External links

 Kamov Ka-60

Fantail helicopters
Ka-60
Military helicopters
1990s Soviet and Russian military transport aircraft
1990s Soviet and Russian helicopters
Twin-turbine helicopters
Aircraft first flown in 1998